In and Out of Consciousness: Greatest Hits 1990–2010 is the second greatest hits compilation album by the British singer-songwriter Robbie Williams, after his first greatest hits compilation, Greatest Hits, which was released in 2004. The album, which features 39 songs, was released in October 2010 and is his last album under his recording contract with EMI. The lead single of the album is "Shame", co-written by and featuring fellow Take That member Gary Barlow. The song is their first collaboration in 15 years since Williams left Take That in 1995.

The album debuted at number one on the UK Albums Chart, making it Williams' ninth album to debut at number one and his first since Rudebox released in 2006. It has been certified Platinum, selling over 41,000 copies on its first day of release and 120,000 copies during its first week, making the album the second-fastest selling of the year in the UK. The album topped the charts in Austria and Germany, and charted within the top five of the charts in Ireland, Italy, the Netherlands, Portugal, Spain and Switzerland.

Background information and production
Speaking about the album and working with Barlow again, Williams said: "It’s incredible to listen to the album and realise that it’s already been 20 years of making music and playing gigs. And the great thing about the album is that it’s not only a celebration of my past but also a bridge to the future. The fact that part of the future includes a name from my past makes it all the more poignant for me".

Beside the lead single, "Shame", the album also features a new track called "Heart and I" co-written with Barlow. The track listing and cover art of the album were revealed on 13 July 2010 on Williams' official website. The image for the cover was captured by photographer Julian Broad, who also worked with Williams for the Reality Killed the Video Star album cover. The cover was shot in May 2010 in Malibu, California.

Promotion
Williams and Barlow performed "Shame" on 12 September 2010 at the Help for Heroes held at the Twickenham Stadium. They also performed the single on Strictly Come Dancing on 2 October 2010. On 8 October 2010 they gave an interview and performed on Paul O'Grady Live. On 7 October 2010 Barlow and Williams performed "Shame" and "Shine" on the BBC Radio 1 Live Lounge. On the release date of the album in the UK, Williams gave an interview on Daybreak as well as performing "Feel" and "Shame".

Singles
The only single to be released is "Shame", a duet co-written with fellow Take That member Gary Barlow. The video and the song premiered on 26 August 2010. Directed by Vaughan Arnell, the video is a spoof of the film Brokeback Mountain. Tim Jonze from The Guardian has said that the song is "a gentle country ballad that tells the story of the pair patching up the relationship that was damaged after Williams left Take That in 1995." It debuted at number two on the UK Singles Chart, making the song Williams' 28th top ten entry on the chart. "Shame" has also charted within the top 10 and top 20 in Denmark, Italy, Germany, Belgium, Ireland and the Netherlands. Yahoo! Music has ranked the video for "Shame" as the 14th best video of 2010.

The compilation does not include "United", a single released by Williams in 2000 as part of Pepsi's "Ask for More" advertising campaign, and three singles only released in certain territories: "Win Some Lose Some", "Better Man" and "Bongo Bong and Je Ne T'aime Plus".

Critical reception

John Bush from AllMusic gave the album four stars out of five. He said that even in its most basic edition, the album presents "no less than 39 examples of what made Robbie Williams a fascinating millennial superstar". He described Williams as "ambitious and self-deprecating, sensitive and boorish, dynamic and introverted" and that the album "presents a much richer picture of Williams' discography". Bush concluded his review by saying that "In and Out of Consciousness certainly offers a full portrait of Robbie Williams, the greatest pop star of the '90s and 2000s that few people appeared to respect but everyone enjoyed."

Sean Egan from BBC Music said that "Many of the songs are amongst the strongest chart hits of the new millennium, especially Williams’ collaborations with Guy Chambers". Egan said that "The sequencing is bizarre but has its own kind of logic, working backwards chronologically" and as "the familiar tunes go by, one is struck by the fact that Williams is both underrated [...] and overrated." He also stated that had Williams "not been sacked by Take That, he would never have been motivated to prove himself with edgy, knowing music light years beyond the boyband." Egan concluded his review by saying that "If this compilation is closing a chapter, the jury is still out on whether the next one is going to be a gripper."

Track listing
In and Out of Consciousness: Greatest Hits 1990–2010 is available in several formats: a two CD standard edition, a three CD deluxe edition with rarities and B-sides, a DVD edition which includes the music videos of the standard edition and an "ultimate edition" which includes all three CDs, the two DVDs and a bonus third DVD with a live recording of Williams' concert at the Velodrom, Berlin in 2005.

Personnel
Credits for In and Out of Consciousness: Greatest Hits 1990–2010 adapted from Allmusic.

 K. Andrews – Composer
 Kelvin Andrews – Composer
 Kevin Andrews – Composer
 Vaughan Arnell – Photography
 G. Barlow – Composer
 Gary Barlow – Composer
 John Barry – Composer
 Eric Bazilian – Composer
 Leslie Bricusse – Composer
 Chris Briggs – A&R
 Julian Broad – Cover photo, photography
 Hamish Brown – Photography
 Johnny Buzzerio – Photography
 Guy Chambers – Arranger, composer, producer
 Desmond Child – Composer
 Brandon Christy – Composer
 Nick Clarke 	Photography
 Bob Clearmountain – Mixing
 Chris Clunn – Photography
 Elain Constantine – Photography
 Tony Cousins – Mastering
 S. Duffy – Producer
 Stephen Duffy – Composer
 Dino Fekaris – Composer
 Dean Freeman – Photography
 Serban Ghenea – Mixing
 Sean Gleason – Photography
 Fergus Greer – Photography
 Stephen Hague – Mixing, producer
 Hammer & Tongs – Photography
 Françoise Hardy – Composer
 C.S. Heath – Composer
 Tom Hingston – Art direction, design
 Trevor Horn – Producer
 Jamie Hughes – Photography
 Seb Janiak – Photography

 Eliot Kennedy – Producer
 Nick Knight – Photography
 Lisa Marie Kurbikoff – Photography
 Chris Lowe – Composer
 Bob Ludwig – Mastering
 George Michael – Composer
 Simon Niblett – Photography
 Robert Orton – Mixing
 Boots Ottestad – Composer
 Scarlett Page – Photography
 Ekundayo Paris – Composer
 C. Carson Parks – Composer
 Freddie Perren – Composer
 Pet Shop Boys – Producer
 Nelson Pigford – Composer
 Steve Power – Mixing, producer
 Mark Ronson – Producer
 Craig Russo – Composer
 S. Dunbar – Composer
 Luis Sanchis – Photography
 Roger Sargent – Photography
 Mary Scanlon – Photography
 Al Schmitt – Engineer, mixing
 Richard Scott – Composer
 Soul Mekanik – Producer
 Danny Spencer – Composer
 L. Taylor – Composer
 Neil Tennant – Composer
 Jerry Jeff Walker – Composer
 Karl Wallinger – Composer
 Mike Ward – Producer
 Tim Weidner – Mixing
 Jeremy Wheatley – Mixing
 R. Williams – Composer, producer
 Robbie Williams – Composer

Commercial performance

Weekly charts

Year-end charts

Decade-end charts

Certifications

Release history

References

External links
 RobbieWilliams.com — Robbie Williams official website

Robbie Williams albums
2010 greatest hits albums
2010 video albums
Music video compilation albums
Albums produced by Mark Ronson
Albums produced by Trevor Horn
Albums produced by Stephen Hague